Oleg Pinchuk (born 15 June 1960, Drohobych, Lviv Oblast) is a Ukrainian painter, sculptor and collector. Honored artist of Ukraine. He was the Head at M17 Contemporary Art Center and the adviser to the Minister of Culture of Ukraine.

Exhibitions 

Oleg Pinchuk is a participant of exhibitions: Cite Internationale des Arts, Ukrainian Seasons (France), KyivArt Contemporary, Great Sculpture Salons (Mystetskyi Arsenal, Kyiv), Kanagawa Municipal Gallery (Japan). 

Pinchuk's works are in the collections of the Kunsthistorisches Museum in Vienna (Austria), at Cartier jewelry company in Geneva (Switzerland), Espace Pierre Cardin in Paris (France), Riga Museum of Foreign Collections (Latvia), Moscow Museum of Modern Art, National Museum of the History of Ukraine, Andrey Sheptytsky National Museum of Lviv and others. Monumental works are located in the historical centers of European cities. Also, Pinchuk's sculpture was included in the top lots at Phillips.

Awards 
 Honored artist of Ukraine

References 

Living people
1960 births
People from Drohobych
Ukrainian sculptors
Ukrainian painters